Bad Saulgau is a town in the district of Sigmaringen, in Baden-Württemberg, Germany. It is situated 23 km east of Sigmaringen, and 27 km north of Ravensburg between the Danube and Lake Constance.

Geography

Bad Saulgau is located north of the wooded hills Wagenhart and a few kilometers west-northwest of the hill Atzenberger Höhe. It is located between the Danube and Lake Constance, on the Danube tributary Schwarzach. The European watershed, which separates the catchment areas of the Rhine and the Danube, runs through the municipal district Lampertsweiler. The waters flowing southward eventually join the Rhine, the northbound ones the Danube.

Neighboring communities
Bad Saulgau borders the following municipalities, clockwise starting from the North: Ertingen, Riedlingen, Allmannsweiler, Bad Buchau, Dürnau, Bad Schussenried, Ebersbach-Musbach, Boms, Eichstegen, Hoßkirch, Ostrach, Hohentengen and Herbertingen.

Subdivisions
Bad Saulgau consists of the main town (with Bernhausen, Enge Weiler, Schwarzach and Wilfertsweiler) and 13 Ortsteile.

History

The first historical reference to the settlement dates back to 819. In 1239, it received town privileges from Frederick II, Holy Roman Emperor. The town became a possession of the House of Habsburg in 1299, and thus part of Further Austria. In Napoleonic times, it was incorporated into the Kingdom of Württemberg. 

During World War II, a subcamp of the Dachau concentration camp was located in the town. In 2005, a memorial commemorating the camp and the victims was inaugurated at the camp's former location.

After World War II, Saulgau was part of the French occupation zone in 1945 and became part of the newly founded state of Württemberg-Hohenzollern in 1947, which was incorporated into the state of Baden-Württemberg in 1952.

In 2000, the name of the town was officially changed from Saulgau to Bad Saulgau, where the German Bad refers to its spa facilities and important natural thermal source.

Education
Apart from nursery schools, Bad Saulgau has several public schools from primary to secondary level, for vocational training as well as a centre for secondary schools specialised in economics or technical training. (Technisches Gymnasium, Wirtschaftsgymnasium)

The Toin Gakuen Schule Deutschland, a Japanese international boarding secondary school, was previously located in Bad Saulgau, but closed in 2012.

Notable people
 Sebastian Rentz (born 1799), winemaker
 Franz Michelberger (born 1955), football player
 Erik E. Lehmann (born 1963), economist
 Stefan Buck (born 1980), football player
 Fabian Gerster (born 1986), football player
 Tatjana Maria born Malek (born 1987), tennis player
 Isabelle Harle (born 1988), swimmer and multiple German champion, world and European champion

Notes 

 
Sigmaringen (district)
Württemberg
Spa towns in Germany